Harold Craig Bailey (born April 12, 1957) is a former American football wide receiver who played two seasons with the Houston Oilers of the National Football League (NFL). He was drafted by the Oilers in the eighth round of the 1980 NFL Draft. Bailey played college football at Oklahoma State University and attended Yates High School in Houston, Texas. He was also a member of the Montreal Concordes of the Canadian Football League.

References

External links
Just Sports Stats
College stats

Living people
1957 births
Players of American football from Houston
Players of Canadian football from Houston
American football quarterbacks
American football wide receivers
Canadian football wide receivers
African-American players of American football
African-American players of Canadian football
Oklahoma State Cowboys football players
Houston Oilers players
Montreal Concordes players
21st-century African-American people
20th-century African-American sportspeople